The Roman Catholic Diocese of Grajaú is a diocese located in the city of Grajaú in the Ecclesiastical province of São Luís do Maranhão in Brazil.

History
 10 February 1922: Established as Territorial Prelature of São José do Grajaú from the Archdiocese of São Luís do Maranhão
 4 August 1981: Promoted as Diocese of São José do Grajaú
 9 October 1984: Renamed as Diocese of Grajaú

Leadership

Ordinaries, in reverse chronological order
 Bishops of Grajaú (Roman rite), below
 Bishop Franco Cuter, O.F.M. Cap. (1998.01.21 – 2016.12.07)
 Bishop Serafino Faustino Spreafico, O.F.M. Cap. (1987.05.13 – 1995.11.02)
 Bishop Tarcísio Sebastião Batista Lopes, O.F.M. Cap. (1984.10.08 – 1986.12.19), continuing when diocese was renamed; appointed Bishop of Ipameri, Goias
 Bishops of São José do Grajaú (Roman Rite), below
 Bishop Tarcísio Sebastião Batista Lopes, O.F.M. Cap. (1984.04.04 – 1984.10.08); diocese renamed
 Bishop Valenti Giacomo Lazzeri, O.F.M. Cap. (1981.08.04 – 1983.01.06)
 Prelates of São José do Grajaú (Roman Rite), below
 Bishop Valenti Giacomo Lazzeri, O.F.M. Cap. (1971.05.18 – 1981.08.04)
 Bishop Adolfo Luís Bossi, O.F.M. Cap. (1966.02.19 – 1970.08.22)
 Bishop Emiliano José Lonati, O.F.M. Cap. (1930.01.10 – 1966.02.19)
 Bishop Roberto Julio Colombo, O.F.M. Cap. (1924.12.18 – 1927.11.08)
 Fr. Roberto de Castellanza, O.F.M. Cap. (Apostolic Administrator 1922 – 1924)

Coadjutor bishop
Adolfo Luís Bossi, O.F.M. Cap. (1958-1966)

References
 GCatholic.org
 Catholic Hierarchy
 Diocese website (Portuguese)

Roman Catholic dioceses in Brazil
Christian organizations established in 1922
Grajaú, Roman Catholic Diocese of
Roman Catholic dioceses and prelatures established in the 20th century